Daschner is a German surname. Notable people with the surname include:

 Lukas Daschner (born 1998), German footballer
 Reinhold Daschner (born 1969), German footballer and manager
 Stephan Daschner (born 1988), German ice hockey player

German-language surnames